Adanech Abebe is an Ethiopian politician and attorney who is serving as the thirty-second mayor of Addis Ababa since 2021. She has been serving as a deputy mayor from 2020 until 2021. She previously was the Minister of Revenue and Customs Authority from 2018 to 2020, when she became the first female to assume the role of the Federal Attorney General of Ethiopia. She is the first woman to hold the mayorship since it was created in 1910.

Early life
Born in Arsi Province, Adanech has little familial disclosure. According to her Education back ground documents. But it was widely known Abebe Deso is her father. She is the only daughter of six children. Abebe's prominence in the province led to establishing Ireecha Primary School in 1977, where Adanech was received as the first female student. Adanech independently taught herself for the sake of her father based on child marriage. Inspired by her deeds, Abebe progressively admitted the violence against women and criticized parents who did not want to allow their female children to attend school. Initially, five girls enrolled the school, only Adanech failed a Grade 6th National Exam (Ministry Exam).

Education
Adanech completed undergraduate studies in law at the Ethiopian Civil Service University in 2001, and received graduate program in leadership from Greenwich University in the United Kingdom.

Political career
Adanech's early career was as an elementary school teacher before becoming the administrative director of the school. Her capability for leadership at both federal and regional levels led her to enter politics.

In 2001, Adanech served as attorney of the Oromia Justice Bureau. In the 2005 general election, she won a seat in the House of People's Representatives Aseko constituency. Then, she took a director position at the Oromia Development Association (ODA), where she served for five years. During the position, Adanech reformed the status of the association and becomes the mayor of Adama. She was the first female in the position and embarked on significant changes during her administration, including the reduction of corruption within the city.

She served as minister of the Revenue and Customs Authority from 2018 to 2020, reinstating corruption and bribery investigations. After serving two years, she was appointed to Federal Attorney General of Ethiopia under the premiership of Abiy Ahmed on 12 March 2020. On 18 August 2020,  she was appointed as Deputy Mayor of Addis Ababa, with 138 voices. Adanech included two individuals from her cabinet. In September 2021, Adanech was elected mayor of the city.

Mayor of Addis Ababa
Adanech is the first woman in the mayor position of Addis Ababa since 1910. Adanech was known for corruption fighting by undertaking significant reforms in Ethiopia, and involved in mobilizing resource to support the government against the rebel TPLF amidst the Tigray War. In November 2021, Adanech visited injured ENDF soldiers at Armed Forces Comprehensive Specialized Hospital in Bishoftu. She donated 15 million birr of medical equipment and other clothes to the military in the course of "law enforcement operation". In October 2021, Adanech visited a cluster wheat farm in Hitosa District in Arsi along with other government officials. At the event, she highlighted to ensure food security and witnessing 680 hectares of land covered with food crop in the current harvest season.  Adanech also expressed anti-American stance on the intervention of the war; during March 2021 pro-government rally, she supported the government by underlying "America and its associates, without understanding the ways of the TPLF forces ways and disastrous acts, they are interfering in our domestic affairs by imposing travel sanctions and prerequisites which can by no means be accepted". 

In the year 2022, the Adanech administration over Addis Ababa stirred criticisms over challenging Ethiopianism. During Adwa Day celebration on 2 March 2022, residents of Addis Ababa chanted against Adanech saying "Step down, Adanech. Step down, Adanech" in Meskel Square. After Balderas Party chairman Eskinder Negga arrived the square, the participants shouted in favor of Eskinder with chant "He is the mayor. He is the mayor". A series of student riots in November and December 2022 erupted following the controversial Oromia flag use in governmental schools, by which police detained 97 individuals allegedly connected to the violence and disinformation. Due to obligated hoisting of Oromia Regional flag, there was protests among primary and secondary students, and ensued clash between students and security forces. Adanech claimed the responsibility of the violence by "radical groups", stating "This agenda is not the issue of the people of Addis Ababa. This agenda belongs to the OLA/Shane, Fano extremists, and western powers. They think that breeding their ill motives starting from Addis Ababa will succeed in their plans.”

Personal life
Although Adanech never shared her personal life via public media, she revealed her husband Teshome Abebe, on a Seifu on EBS talk show episode. Adanech also told she has two children, a boy, and a girl. She also thanked Teshome for being a "caring and supportive person" in the family and helping to complete her education.

See also
 Council of Ministers of Abiy Ahmed

References

Living people
20th-century Ethiopian women
21st-century Ethiopian politicians
21st-century Ethiopian women politicians
Mayors of Addis Ababa
Attorneys general
Finance ministers of Ethiopia
 People from Oromia Region
Alumni of the University of Greenwich
Year of birth missing (living people)
Women government ministers of Ethiopia
Women mayors